Dave Alleyne (born 15 February 1972) is a Barbadian footballer who played as a midfielder for Livingston.

Club career

Barbados
Alleyne began his career playing for Lambada in his native Barbados.

Scotland
In 1994, he moved to Scotland along with compatriot Horace Stoute and signed for Meadowbank Thistle after a successful trial period.  Alleyne made 5 appearances for the club.

He remained with the club as they relocated and were renamed Livingston in 1995.  He made 45 appearances for Livingston and scored 3 goals.

International career
Alleyne was called up to represent Barbados on several occasions and was capped 6 times.

References

External links
David Alleyne on Soccerbase

1972 births
Living people
Barbadian footballers
Scottish Football League players
Association football midfielders
Livingston F.C. players
Barbados international footballers